Volleyball competitions at the 2022 Bolivarian Games in Valledupar, Colombia were held from 24 June to 5 July 2022 at Coliseo Cubierto Julio Monsalvo Castilla.

Two medal events were scheduled to be contested: a men's and women's tournament. A total of 132 athletes (72 athletes–6 teams for men and 60 athletes–5 teams for women) competed in the events. Both tournaments were restricted to under-23 players.

Venezuela and Dominican Republic were the defending men's and women's gold medalists, respectively. Colombia won the gold medal in both men and women tournaments.

Participating nations
A total of 6 nations (5 ODEBO nations and 1 invited) registered teams for the volleyball events. Each nation was able to enter a maximum of 24 athletes (one team of 12 athletes per gender). Hosts Colombia, Dominican Republic, Peru, Venezuela and Bolivia participated in both events while Chile only participated in the men's tournament.

Medal summary

Medal table

Medalists

Venue
All matches in both events will be played at Coliseo Cubierto Julio Monsalvo Castilla in Valledupar, with a capacity for 20,000 spectators.

Men's tournament

The men's tournament was held from 24 to 28 June 2022 and consisted of a group stage and a final stage.

All match times are in COT (UTC−5).

Group stage
The group stage consisted of two groups of 3 teams, each group was played under round-robin format with the top two teams progressing to the semi-finals.

Pool A

Pool B

Final stage
The final stage consisted of the 5th–6th place match (between the third placed teams of pools A and B), the semi-finals and the bronze and gold medal matches. The semi-finals match-ups were: 
Semifinal 1: Winners Pool B v Runners-up Pool A
Semifinal 2: Winners Pool A v Runners-up Pool B

Winners of semi-finals played the gold medal match, while losers played the bronze medal match.

Semi-finals

5th–6th place match

Bronze medal match

Gold medal match

Women's tournament

The women's tournament was held from 1 to 5 July 2022 and consisted of a single group of 5 teams in which each team played once against the other 4 teams in the group on a single round-robin basis. The top three teams were awarded gold, silver and bronze medals respectively.

Standings

Matches
All match times are in COT (UTC−5).

References

External links
Bolivarianos Valledupar 2022 Volleyball

Volleyball
Bolivarian Games
2022
2022 Bolivarian Games